Blind Faith is American rock band Warrant's fourth power ballad. It was released in 1991 as the fourth single from Warrant's second album Cherry Pie. The song charted at #88 on the Billboard Hot 100 and #39 on the Mainstream Rock Tracks chart.

Music video
The power ballad features acoustic guitar, banjo, piano mixed in with guitars. The music video begins in black and white with Jani Lane singing and playing guitar against a black background. The band joins him at the chorus and the video turns into color.

Track listing

Charts

References

1990 songs
1991 singles
Glam metal ballads
Warrant (American band) songs
Songs written by Jani Lane
Columbia Records singles